Metaxanthia is a genus of moths in the family Erebidae. The genus was erected by Herbert Druce in 1899.

Species
Metaxanthia atribasis
Metaxanthia threnodes
Metaxanthia vespiformis

References

External links

Phaegopterina
Moth genera